The 1828 United States presidential election in Maryland took place between October 31 and December 2, 1828, as part of the 1828 United States presidential election. Voters chose 11 representatives, or electors to the Electoral College, who voted for President and Vice President.

Maryland voted for the National Republican candidate, John Quincy Adams, over the Democratic candidate, Andrew Jackson. Adams won Maryland by a margin of 0.5%.

Results

Results by county

See also
 United States presidential elections in Maryland
 1828 United States presidential election
 1828 United States elections

Notes

References 

Maryland
1828
Presidential